Gerard Collier, 5th Baron Monkswell (28 January 1947 – 12 July 2020) was a British hereditary peer.

Life
He was educated at Portsmouth University (BSc Mechanical Eng, 1971) and Thames Valley University. He succeeded to the title Baron Monkswell in 1984, and was a Member of the House of Lords from 1985 to 1999. He was a Labour Party Member of Manchester City Council from 1989 to 1994.

Lord Monkswell was an unsuccessful candidate in by-elections to the House of Lords in 2003, 2005, and 2011.

He died on 12 July 2020 at the age of 73.

References

1947 births
2020 deaths
Alumni of the University of Portsmouth
5
Gerard
Labour Party (UK) hereditary peers

Monkswell